The 11th Parachute Brigade is a unit of the French Army, predominantly infantry, part of the French Airborne Units and specialized in air combat and air assault. The brigade's primary vocation is to project in emergency in order to contribute a first response to a situational crisis. An elite unit of the French Army, the brigade is commanded by a général de brigade (Brigadier General) with headquarters in Balma near Toulouse. The brigade's soldiers and airborne Marines wear the red beret (amaranth) except for the Legionnaires of the 2ème REP who wear the green beret.

The 11th Parachute Brigade, originally the 11th Light Intervention Division (11e DLI), was created from airborne units of the 10th Parachute Division 10e D.P and 25th Parachute Division 25e D.P, both dissolved following the Algiers putsch of 1961 during the Algerian War.

Creation and different nominations 

 On May 1, 1961; the 11th Light Intervention Division was created from dissolved airborne units of the 10th and 25th Parachute Division.
 On December 1, 1963; the 11th Division was created by merging the 11th Light Intervention Division and the 9th Brigade 9e B.D.E.
 On April 1, 1971; the 11th Division became the 11th Parachute Division (11e DP).
 In June 1999; the 11th Parachute Division became the 11th Parachute Brigade (11e BP).

Origin and history

11th Light Intervention Division – 11e DLI 

the 11th Light Interventtion Division was created on May 1, 1961, from airborne elements of the 10th Parachute Division and 25th Parachute Division, both dissolved following the Algiers putsch of 1961, and from the 11th Intervention Division (11e DI), set at the time to create a total of three airborne divisions. The division commanded by General Marzloff returned to mainland France on July 1, 1961. On August 1, 1963, the 13th Parachute Dragoon Regiment leaves the Division and takes garrison in Lorraine at Dieuze and Nancy.

Order of battle 
Since creation the 11th Light Intervention Division comprised the following:

 Command and Support Structure
 61st Headquarters Company (61e CQG)
 61st Transmission Company (61e CT)
 French Army Light Aviation (ALAT) Platoon
 Transport Group 513 (GT 513)
 61st Airborne Engineer Company (61e CGAP)
 61st Repair Division Company (61e CRD)
 61st Medical Company (61e CMA)
 61st Provision Section (61e SRI)
 Parachute Infantry
 1st Parachute Chasseur Regiment (1er RCP)
 9th Parachute Chasseur Regiment (9e RCP)
 3rd Marine Infantry Parachute Regiment (3e RPMIa)
 6th Marine Infantry Parachute Regiment (6e RPMIa)
 8th Marine Infantry Parachute Regiment (8e RPMIa)
 Parachute Artillery
 35th Parachute Artillery Regiment (35e RALP)
 Parachute Cavalry
 1st Parachute Hussar Regiment (1er RHP)

At the time, there were no regiments of the Foreign Legion in the newly enacted division. On October 1, 1963; the division integrated the BOMAP (Airborne Operational Mobile Base).

11th Division – 11e DIV 
On December 1, 1963, the 11th Light Intervention Division merged with the 9th Colonial Infantry Division and became the 11th Division. Starting July 1966 and excluding elements of Division support; the unit activated and operated around three distinct Brigades, the 9th Marine Infantry Brigade at Saint-Malo, the 20th Airborne Brigade (20e BAP) at Toulouse and the 25th Airborne Brigade (25e BAP) at Pau.

A support battalion, the 61e BS was created on February 1, 1964, at Auch. The 61e BS supervised health services and provisions in the Division. In March, the 61st Airborne Signals Battalion (61e BTAP) steps in at Pau and regroups the existing transmission companies.

In July 1966, the 11th Division reached 16,000 men and was composed of two brigades (the 20e BAP at Toulouse and the 25e BAP at Pau) forming five parachute regiments.

Order of battle 

Command and Support Structure
 61st Headquarters Company (61e CQG)
 61st Airborne Signals Battalion (61e BTAP)
 1st Parachute Hussar Regiment (1er RHP)
 Régiment d'infanterie-chars de marine (RICM), formerly part of the Moroccan Division
 35th Parachute Artillery Regiment (35e RAP)
 11th Marine Artillery Regiment (11e RAMa) part of current 9th Marine Infantry Brigade
 17th Parachute Engineer Regiment (17e RGAP)
 5th Helicopter Combat Regiment (5e RHC); Light Aviation Group of the 11th Division (GALDIV 11)
 Air Mobil Command Post 50/351 (PCAM)
 Airborne Operational Mobile Base (BOMAP)
 61st Support Battalion (61e BS)
 61e CMLAP
 11e CLRM
 511e CRRM
 11e and 61e SEI
 9th Outremer Brigade (9e BOM)
 1st Marine Infantry Regiment (1e RIMa)
 2nd Marine Infantry Regiment (2e RIMa)
 3rd Marine Infantry Regiment (3e RIMa)
 409e BS
 20th Airborne Brigade (20e BAP)
 9th Parachute Chasseur Regiment (9e RCP)
 3rd Marine Infantry Parachute Regiment (3e RPMIa)
 8th Marine Infantry Parachute Regiment (8e RPMIa)
 CLT N5
 25th Airborne Brigade (25e BAP)
 1st Parachute Chasseur Regiment (1er RCP)
 6th Marine Infantry Parachute Regiment (6e RPMIa)
 CLT N6

11th Parachute Division – 11e DP 

The 11th division disappeared on April 1, 1971, to give formation to the 11th Parachute Division at Toulouse. The 9th Outremer Brigade (9e BOM) left the Division and the 20th Airborne Brigade (20e BAP), the 25th Airborne Brigade (25e BAP) became subsequently the 1st and 2nd Parachute Brigades and integrated each one support battalion. The three support regiments were reorganized in two interim regiments of intervention that conserved nevertheless their original nominations (1st Parachute Hussar Regiment and the 35th Parachute Artillery Regiment). The 17th Parachute Engineer Regiment disappeared.

Order of battle 
On July 1, 1971, the 11th Parachute Division is composed of the following:

Command and Support Structure
 61st Headquarter Squadron (61e EQG)
 61st Transmission Company (61e CT)
 5th Combat Helicopter Regiment (5e RHC); Light Aviation Group Division (GALDIV 11)
 Airborne Operational Mobile Base (BOMAP)
 Air Mobile Command Post 50/351 (PCAM)
 1st Parachute Brigade (1re BP)
 9th Parachute Chasseur Regiment (9e RCP)
 3rd Marine Infantry Parachute Regiment (3e RPMIa)
 8th Marine Infantry Parachute Regiment (8e RPMIa)
 35th Parachute Artillery Regiment (35e RAP)
 420th Command and Support Battalion (420e BCS)
 2nd Parachute Brigade (2e BP)
 1st Parachute Chasseur Regiment (1er RCP)
 2nd Foreign Parachute Regiment (2e REP)
 6th Marine Infantry Parachute Regiment (6e RPMIa)
 1st Parachute Hussar Regiment (1er RHP)
 425th Command and Support Battalion (425e BCS)

On August 1, 1973; the 61st Headquarter Squadron and the 61st Transmission Company were regrouped and form the 61e BCT. The following year in 1974, the 17th Parachute Engineer Regiment was recreated and the interarm regiments find their specialities. On August 1, 1974, the 1st Marine Infantry Parachute Regiment (1e RPIMa) was reattached to the Division.

Units belonging to the 2nd Foreign Parachute Regiment (2e REP) and the 35th Parachute Artillery Regiment (35e RAP) took part in Operation Tacaud starting from 1978 in Chad.

Still in 1978, and within the cadre of military cooperation with Zaïre which anticipates assistance and formation, the 2nd Foreign Prachute Regiment is parachuted during the Battle of Kolwezi, and participated in alliance with Belgium Paratroopers to the Rescue of Kolwezi. During this intervention, two teams of the 13th Parachute Dragoon Regiment and one team from the 1st Marine Parachute Infantry Regiment (1e RPIMa) were deployed to forward operating terrain on observation and reconnaissance missions.

During this time, France was manned with an intervention force of 20,000 strong composed of the 11th Parachute Division, the 9th Marine Infantry Division (9e DIMa), aerial forces and Naval contingents.

On October 23, 1983; one company of the 1st Parachute Chasseur Regiment stationed in Lebanon within the Multinational Force in Lebanon was victim to the 1983 Beirut barracks bombing and occasions 55 paratrooper deaths within the ranks of the 1er RCP and the 3 paratroopers within the ranks of the 9th Parachute Chasseur Regiment.

In the aftermath of the Cold War, the French Army reorganised and the 11e DP which became the 11th Parachute Brigade in 1999.

11th Parachute Brigade – 11e BP 

In 1999, as part of the restructuring of the French Army, the 11th Parachute Brigade was formed at Balma (Balman Toulouse Garrison), the base of the 11th Parachute Division. The brigade would later be engaged in Africa and Afghanistan.

Africa 
The 11th Parachute Brigade, mainly the 2nd Foreign Parachute Regiment (2e REP), took part in Opération Licorne in the Ivory Coast.

Afghanistan 

From 2006 to 2007, the parachute brigade intervened in Afghanistan as part of the French Detachment of NATO's International Force. In September 2007, the brigade was relieved by Chasseurs Alpins of the 27th Mountain Infantry Brigade (27e BIM).

The paratroopers of the 1st Parachute Chasseur Regiment (1er RCP), of the 11th Parachute Brigade, took up its first rotation, and was in place by Sunday, 1 May 2011, in Kapisa Province. Four more rotations would follow. A total of 650 military personnel were scheduled for a mission to maintain zonal security.

On 10 May 2011, two combat parachute companies of the 1e RCP—almost 200 men commanded by général Emmanuel Maurin, commander of the 11th Parachute Brigade—were projected east towards Nijrab District, on a mission lasting several months. As a result, 1000 paratroopers were engaged in Afghanistan, principally from the 1e RCP, which were supported by the 11th Parachute Brigade, the 1st Parachute Hussar Regiment, the 17th Parachute Engineer Regiment, 35th Parachute Artillery Regiment, and the 1st Train Parachute Regiment.

From April to October 2001, while preparing for this mission, the 11th brigade rehearsed realistic simulations, in order to achieve operational readiness within the newly established Brigade La Fayette joint command. In Afghanistan, reinforcements served for periods from 6 months to a year in Nijrab District, in northeastern Kapisa Province, while attached to the Tactical Interam Group of Kapisa (TIGK).

As of June 20, 2011, the 11th Parachute Brigade was the brigade that endured the most losses, with 18 casualties, in Afghanistan.

Mali 
In January 2013, 250 French paratroopers from the 2nd Foreign Parachute Regiment (2e REP), 11th Parachute Brigade, jumped into Northern Mali to support an offensive to capture the city of Timbuktu.

Present Brigade

Mission 
The 11th Parachute Brigade is a light mobile brigade capable of projecting power around the world in an emergency, as a first response to a crisis.

Superior commands 
The 11th Parachute Brigade is the only parachute brigade of the French Army and is under Ground Forces Command. However, the brigade does not comprise all the parachutes regiments of France, as the 1st Marine Infantry Parachute Regiment (1er RPIMa) and the 13th Parachute Dragoon Regiment (13e RDP) are attached to the French Army Special Forces Brigade, while the 2nd Marine Infantry Parachute Regiment (2e RPIMa)—stationed permanently in outre-mer, near Réunion island—is under the command of the Armed Forces Zones of the Indian Ocean (FAZSOI).

Order of battle 

The 11th Parachute Brigade is composed primarily of infantry, with elements of artillery, light cavalry, and combat-engineer regiments. The brigade also includes a Commando Parachute Group (GCP), an elite unit of pathfinders.

At the beginning of 2000, the brigade was based in southwestern France, except for the 2nd Foreign Parachute Regiment (2e REP) stationed in Calvi, Corsica. The brigade consists of 10,200 active and reserve personnel distributed in a central headquarters command and 8 operational regiments with the following composition:

 Central Command
 General Headquarters in Balma.
 11th Parachute Command Transmission Company (11e CCTP) at Balma.
 Commando Parachute Group Teams.
 Combat Parachute Regiments
 1 Régiment de Hussards Parachutistes (1 RHP) Parachute Hussar Regiment in Tarbes with ERC 90.
 1 Régiment de Chasseurs Parachutistes (1 RCP) Parachute Chasseur Regiment in Pamiers.
 2 Régiment Etranger de Parachutistes (2 REP) Foreign Legion Parachute Regiment in Calvi.
 3 Régiment de Parachutistes d'Infanterie de Marine (3 RPIMa) Marine Parachute Regiment in Carcassonne.
 8 Régiment de Parachutistes d'Infanterie de Marine (8 RPIMa) Marine Parachute Regiment in Castres.
Combat Parachute Support Regiments
 1st Train Parachute Regiment, Parachute Supply Regiment in Toulouse
 35 Régiment d'Artillerie Parachutiste (35 RAP) Parachute Artillery Regiment in Tarbes  with TRF1 howitzers, CAESAR self-propelled howitzers and RTF1 mortars.
 17 Régiment du Génie Parachutiste (17 RGP) Parachute Engineer Regiment in Montauban.

Equipment

Vehicles 
 ERC-90 Sagaie
 Véhicule Blindé Léger Panhard (VBL)
 Véhicule de l'Avant Blindé (VAB)
  Airmobil Logistical Vehicle Auverland A3F (ALV)
 Small Protected Vehicle (SPV)
 All Terrain Vehicle Peugeot P4 (ATVP P4)
 Light Recon Support Vehicle (LRSV)
 TRM 2000 Truck (TRM)
 Vehicle Transport Logistique (VTL)
 Tracto-chargeur TC 910
 Mini benne TWAITES TND3
 Caterpillar D3 air-transportable

Armament

Artillery 
 CAESAR self-propelled howitzers
 120mm F1 Mortars
 Mistral Surface to Air Missiles

Support Weapons 
 81 mm Mortar
 Anti-Tank Firing Missile Milan (Milan)
 Anti-Tank Firing Missile Eryx (Eryx)

Small Arms 
 Anti-Tank 84 mm Rocket (AT4)
 FN Light Machine Gun (Minimi)
  51 mm Grenade Launcher F1 Model (GLF1)
 12.7mm High Caliber Precision (12.7 PGM II)
 7.62 FRF2 Precision Rifle (FRF2)
 5.56 Famas Assault Rifle F1 (FAMAS)

Traditions 

Except for the troops of the 1e REG, 2e REG, 2e REP who wear a green beret, the French army metropolitan and marine paratroopers forming the 11th Parachute Brigade wear a red Beret.

The saint's day of Archangel Saint Michael, patron of French paratroopers, is celebrated on 29 September.

The prière du Para (Prayer of the Paratrooper) was written by André Zirnheld in 1938.

Insignia 

With the paratrooper brevet of the French Army, the insignia of French paratroopers was created in 1946. The French Army insignia of metropolitan paratroopers consists of a closed "winged armed dextrochere", ("right winged arm") with a sword pointing upwards. The insignia makes reference to the patron saint of paratroopers and represents "the right Arm of Saint Michael", the Archangel, which, according to Liturgy, is the "armed arm of God". This insignia is the symbol of righteous combat and fidelity to superiors and to the mission. The French Army Insignia of Marine Infantry Paratroopers is over a marine anchor.

Brigade Commanders

See also 

Chief of the Defence Staff of the Armed Forces (French: Chef d'État-Major des Armées, CEMA)
Chief of Staff of the French Army (French: Chef d'État-Major de l'Armée de Terre, CEMAT)
Chief of Staff of the French Air Force (French: Chef d'État-Major de l'Armée de l'Air, CEMAA)
Chief of Staff of the French Navy (French: Chef d'État-Major de la Marine, CEMM)
Direction générale de la Gendarmerie Nationale (French: Direction Générale de la Gendarmerie nationale (DGGN))
French Special Operations Command (French: Commandement des Opérations Spéciales (COS))
Franco-German Brigade
Honneur et Fidélité
List of French paratrooper units

Sources

External links 
 French Ministry of Defense, French Armed Forces, Section French Army, Official Website of the 11th Parachute Division  11 BP official page
History of the 1st Parachute Chasseur Regiment, 9th Parachute Chasseur Regiment, 14th Parachute Chasseur Regiment and 18th Parachute Chasseur Regiment

Brigades of France
Airborne units and formations of France
11
Military units and formations established in 1961
Military units and formations disestablished in 1963
Military units and formations established in 1963
Military units and formations disestablished in 1971
Military units and formations established in 1971
Military units and formations disestablished in 1999
Military units and formations established in 1999
1961 establishments in France